A Shot in the Dark is a 1964 comedy film directed by Blake Edwards in Panavision. It is the second installment in The Pink Panther film series, with Peter Sellers reprising his role as Inspector Jacques Clouseau of the French Sûreté.

Clouseau's blundering personality is unchanged, but it was in this film that Sellers began to give him the idiosyncratically exaggerated French accent that was to later become a hallmark of the character. The film also marks the first appearances of Herbert Lom as his long-suffering boss, Commissioner Dreyfus, as well as André Maranne as Dreyfus's assistant François and Burt Kwouk as Clouseau's stalwart manservant Cato, all three of whom would become series regulars. Elke Sommer portrays the murder suspect, Maria Gambrelli. The character of Gambrelli would return in Son of the Pink Panther (1993), this time played by Claudia Cardinale, who appeared as Princess Dala in The Pink Panther (1963). Graham Stark, who portrays police officer Hercule Lajoy, would reprise this role eighteen years later, in Trail of the Pink Panther (1982).

The film was not originally written to include Clouseau, but was an adaptation of a stage play by Harry Kurnitz adapted from a French play L'Idiote by Marcel Achard. The film was released only a year after the first Clouseau film, The Pink Panther, the biggest difference being that, without David Niven, Clouseau is the main character and not Niven's foil.

Plot 
Late at night at the country home of millionaire Benjamin Ballon, several of its occupants are moving about rooms, hiding and spying on others. The household consists of: Ballon's wife Dominique; Henri Lafarge, the head butler, and his wife Madame Lafarge, the cook; Miguel Ostos, the head chauffeur; Pierre, the second chauffeur, and his wife Dudu, the head maid; Georges the gardener, and his wife Simone, the second maid; Maria Gambrelli, the third maid; and Maurice, the second butler. The night's events soon end with gunshots in the room of Maria, and Miguel found murdered. Inspector Clouseau of the Sûreté, a bumbling and incompetent detective, is called out to the scene, accompanied by his assistant Hercule Lajoy. Suspicion is cast upon Maria, as she was found by Maurice clutching the gun that killed the victim. Before Clouseau can investigate further, his superior Commissioner Dreyfus removes him from the investigation out of fear he will bungle a high-profile case.

The following day, while training with his manservant Cato under a strict unplanned arrangement between them, Clouseau finds himself returned to the investigation after Dreyfus is ordered by his superiors to do so, through Ballon's political influence. In discussion with Hercule about the murder, Clouseau asserts that Maria is innocent despite the evidence against her, but believes she is protecting the real killer whom he suspects might be Ballon himself. To keep her under surveillance during the investigation he arranges for her release from prison. However, two more murders occur - George in the Ballon's greenhouse; and Dudu at a nudist camp - with the evidence pointing towards Maria in each case. Despite the facts, Clouseau continues to believe she is innocent, which leaves Dreyfus dismayed at his incompetence in the case and the scandals he causes. After the body of Henri is found in the closet of Maria's bedroom, Clouseau is once more removed from the case.

Although Dreyfus begins to suspect Ballon is trying to cover up facts about the murder, assuming that he is shielding someone with Maria's help, Clouseau's theory about her innocence leaves him worried that he could be undone. When he is forced to put him back on the case, he eventually suffers a nervous breakdown upon hearing of him going out for the evening with Maria. That night, several attempts are made on Clouseau's life at various establishments, including his apartment, but all of these fail while resulting in the death of several innocent bystanders. The increased notoriety of the case as a result of the incidents, coupled with proving Clouseau's theory correct, slowly cause Dreyfus to become unhinged.

Clouseau finally decides to confront the Ballon household over the murders, hoping to trick the murderer into unmasking themselves. However, his plan unexpectedly proves Maria innocent in all four murders. Dominique reveals she killed Miguel by mistake, believing he was her husband whom she thought was having an affair with Maria; Madame LaFarge murdered George because he was about to leave her for Dominique; Simone killed Dudu in order to maintain her affair with Pierre; and Ballon murdered Henri because he was having an affair with his wife. Pierre also reveals that Maurice and Dudu were blackmailing Dominique. In the chaos that ensues, Clouseau's plan comes to its climax when Hercule cuts the lights. The Ballons, Madame LaFarge, Pierre, Simone, and Maurice flee and attempt to escape in Clouseau's car, unaware that Dreyfus had planted a bomb in it, intending to kill Clouseau. The bomb explodes, killing all six guilty parties. Believing everyone was innocent, despite what they had confessed to, Dreyfus loses his sanity and is dragged away by Hercule. Clouseau, embracing Maria, finally declares her innocent, but a passionate kiss between the two is swiftly interrupted when Cato makes a sneak attack on them.

Cast 

 Peter Sellers as Inspector Jacques Clouseau
 Elke Sommer as Maria Gambrelli
 Herbert Lom as Commissioner Charles Dreyfus
 George Sanders as Monsieur Ballon
 Graham Stark as Hercule Lajoy
 André Maranne as Sgt. François Chevalier
 Martin Benson as Maurice
 Burt Kwouk as Cato
 Tracy Reed as Dominique Ballon
 Moira Redmond as Simone
 Vanda Godsell as Madame LaFarge
 Maurice Kaufmann as Pierre
 Ann Lynn as Dudu
 David Lodge as Georges
 Douglas Wilmer as Henri LaFarge
 Reginald Beckwith as Receptionist	
 Bryan Forbes as Turk, the Nudist Camp Attendant
 André Charrise as Game Warden
 Howard Greene as Gendarme
 John Herrington as The Doctor
 Jack Melford as The Psycho-Analyst
 Victor Baring as Taxi Driver
 Victor Beaumont as Gendarme
 Tutte Lemkow as Cossack Dancer
 Hurtado De Cordoba Ballet as Flamenco Dancers & Guitarist
 Fred Hugh as Balding Customer
 Rose Hill as Soprano
 Tahitian Dance Group as Tahitian Dance Group

Production 
Sellers was attached to star in the adaptation of Harry Kurnitz's Broadway hit before the release and success of The Pink Panther, but was not pleased with the script by Alec Coppel and Norman Krasna. Walter Mirisch approached Blake Edwards and asked him to take over as director of A Shot in the Dark from Anatole Litvak. Edwards declined initially, but eventually relented under pressure on the condition he could rewrite the script and substitute Inspector Clouseau for the lead character and choreograph comic scenes on the fly as he and Sellers had successfully done for their previous film. The relationship between Edwards and Sellers deteriorated to such a point that at the conclusion of the film they vowed never to work together again. They eventually reconciled to collaborate successfully four years later on The Party, and on three more "Pink Panther" films in the 1970s.

Taking inspiration from his teacher Ed Parker in martial arts, Edwards created the new character Cato Fong using the American Kenpo style. Parker briefly worked alongside Edwards learning more about cinematography and suggested that he implement slow motions at certain fight scenes in order to increase the dramatic effect and make the moves more noticeable for audiences. Following a favorable response from viewers, Edwards continued to use this effect in following Pink Panther films.

As with most of the other Clouseau films, A Shot in the Dark features an animated opening titles sequence produced by DePatie-Freleng Enterprises utilizing an animated version of Inspector Clouseau. This film and Inspector Clouseau are the only Clouseau films not to feature the Pink Panther character in the opening titles. Henry Mancini's theme for this film serves as opening theme and incidental music in The Inspector cartoon shorts made by DePatie-Freleng from 1965 to 1969.

The title song 'The Shadows of Paris' was written by Henry Mancini. The singer is not credited but contemporary trade reports confirm it was Decca Records recording artist Gina Carroll.

Reception 
Bosley Crowther of The New York Times wrote, "It is mad, but the wonderful dexterity and the air of perpetually buttressed dignity with which Mr. Sellers plays his role make what could quickly be monotonous enjoyable to the end." Variety wrote: "Wisdom remains to be seen of projecting a second appearance of the hilariously inept detective so soon after the still-current firstrun showing of 'Panther,' since some of the spontaneous novelty may have worn off, but the laughs are still there abundantly through imaginative bits of business and a few strike belly proportions." Philip K. Scheuer of the Los Angeles Times wrote that the film "is all variations of falling down and going boom ... I won't say 'ad nauseum' [sic] because Sellers is a clever comedian and never that painful to take. But enough is enough already." Richard L. Coe of The Washington Post called it "a hardworking comedy," adding "While the lines are bright and sometimes blue, the real fun comes from sight gags, an old if neglected film ingredient." The Monthly Film Bulletin wrote, "Where The Pink Panther had style and a certain subtlety, its successor ... can substitute only slapstick of the crudest kind. As the bumbling inspector, Sellers is this time absolutely out of hand, his principal—and endlessly repeated—gag being to fall with a resounding splash into large quantities of water." John McCarten of The New Yorker wrote, "'A Shot in the Dark' as done on Broadway was a mediocre comedy, but Blake Edwards, who directed the film and collaborated on the script with William Peter Blatty, had the good sense to toss the foundation stock out the window and let Mr. Sellers run amok ... All in all, extremely jolly."

The movie was one of the 13 most popular films in the UK in 1965.

The film was well received by critics. , it has 94% favourable reviews on review aggregator Rotten Tomatoes out of 32 reviews counted. The average rating given by critics is 8.1 out of 10. The critical consensus reads: "A Shot in the Dark is often regarded as the best of the Pink Panther sequels, and Peter Sellers gives a top-notch performance that makes slapstick buffoonery memorable."

In 2006, the film was voted the 38th greatest comedy film of all time in Channel 4's 50 Greatest Comedy Films

The film is recognized by the American Film Institute in these lists:
 2000: AFI's 100 Years...100 Laughs – #48
 2008: AFI's 10 Top 10:
 Nominated Mystery Film

See also
List of American films of 1964

Notes

References

External links 

 
 
 
 
 
 

1964 films
1960s crime comedy films
1960s comedy mystery films
American crime comedy films
American sequel films
British comedy mystery films
1960s English-language films
Films scored by Henry Mancini
American films based on plays
Films directed by Blake Edwards
Films set in country houses
Films set in France
Films set in Paris
The Pink Panther films
1960s police comedy films
British serial killer films
American serial killer films
United Artists films
Films based on multiple works
1960s serial killer films
Films with screenplays by Blake Edwards
1964 comedy films
1960s parody films
Films shot at MGM-British Studios
American films with live action and animation
1960s American films
1960s British films